The flag of Thailand (meaning 'tricolour flag') shows five horizontal stripes in the colours red, white, blue, white and red, with the central blue stripe being twice as wide as each of the other four. The design was adopted on 28 September 1917, according to the royal decree issued by Rama VI. Since 2016, that day is a national day of importance in Thailand celebrating the flag.

The colours are said to stand for nation-religion-king, an unofficial motto of Thailand, red for the land and people, white for religions and blue for the monarchy, the last having been the auspicious colour of Rama VI. As the king declared war on Germany that July, some note the flag now bore the same colours as those of the UK, France, Russia and the United States.

Design
The Flag Act of BE 2522 (1979) stipulates the design of the national flag as "rectangular in shape with 6 part width and 9 part length, divided into five stripes throughout the length of the flag; with the middle stripe being 2 part wide, of deep blue colour, and the white stripes being 1 part wide next to each side of the deep blue stripes, and the red stripes being 1 part wide next to each side of the white stripes. The National Flag shall also be called the Tri-Rong flag".

Colour standards
The colours of the flag were standardised in an announcement of the Office of the Prime Minister dated 30 September 2017, on the occasion of the 100th anniversary of its adoption. It gives recommended values for determining the standard colours of physical cloth flags, defined in the CIELAB colour space under Illuminant D65. RGB, HEX and CMYK values are derived by NSTDA.

Construction Sheet

History 

The first flag used for Siam was probably a plain red one, first used under Narai (1656–1688). Naval flags later used different symbols on the red ground—a white chakra, or the Hindu mythological elephant Airavata inside the chakra.

Officially the first flag was created in 1855 by Mongkut (Rama IV), showing a white elephant on red ground, as the plain coloured flag was not distinct enough for international relations.

In 1916 the flag was changed to show a white elephant in royal regalia. In 1916, the current design, but with the middle colour being the same red as the outer stripe, was defined as the civil ensign. The story goes that during a flood Vajiravudh (Rama VI) saw the flag hanging upside-down, and to prevent this from happening again created a new flag which was symmetrical. Later in 1917, the middle colour was changed to dark blue, which was similar in tone to indigo, which at the time was regarded as the auspicious colour for Saturday, the day Vajiravudh was born. According to other sources, the blue colour was also chosen to show solidarity with the Allies of World War I, which also had the colours blue-red-white in their flags.

Timeline

Maritime flags 

The naval ensign of the Royal Thai Navy (RTN) is the national flag with a red circle in the middle that reaches as far as the red stripes at the top and bottom. In the circle stands a white elephant, in full caparison, facing the hoist. The kingdom's naval jack is the national flag defaced with the emblem of the Royal Thai Navy in the middle. The regimental colours of the RTN is as same as this flag; both ensigns were adopted in 1917.

See also
 List of Thai flags
 Royal Standard of Thailand
 Royal Flags of Thailand
 List of Military flags of Thailand
 Flag of India, which has a similar name "Tiranga"
 Flag desecration in Thailand

Sources

References

External links

 
 Royal Flags (Thailand)
 Siam Flag museum (Thai only)
 Historical Thai flag

 
National symbols of Thailand
Thailand
Thailand
Thailand